The Gander Flyers (also commonly known as the Kelly Ford Gander Flyers due to a sponsorship deal that began October 3, 2014)  were a senior ice hockey team based in Gander, Newfoundland and Labrador  and a member of in the Central West Senior Hockey League.

History
The Gander Flyers hockey club has its roots in picked teams from the Royal Canadian Air Force hockey league at RCAF Station Gander during the Second World War and from the Gander Hockey League picked team that entered Newfoundland inter-town senior hockey competition in 1947. The RCAF 'Bombers' and 'Fliers' played exhibition games at other Newfoundland hockey centres during World War II including Corner Brook and Grand Falls.

Gander first joined the Newfoundland Amateur Hockey Association, and the race for the Herder Memorial Trophy, in 1947 as part of the Central Division with teams from Bishop's Falls, Buchans and Grand Falls.

Gander's entry into Newfoundland senior hockey was occasionally nicknamed the 'Flyers' until an official name change in the early 1960s. From 1953 to 1959, Gander entered a team in provincial Section B senior hockey in competition for the Evening Telegram Trophy. The all-stars were finalists in the 1954 all-Newfoundland senior 'B' championships hosted by Grand Falls but lost the close series to the Bell Island All-Stars 2-games-to-1. In 1960, the all-stars became part of the Western Division and in 1963 Gander joined the province-wide Newfoundland Senior Hockey League (NSHL). In 1967, Flyers' import goaltender Lyle Carter was invited by the Conception Bay CeeBees to play in the Allan Cup; Carter later went on to play 15 NHL games with the California Golden Seals in 1971-72.

The Flyers were part of the NSHL, with the exception of a two-year break in the mid-1970s, until the hockey club folded in 1983. The Gander Flyers started the 1982-83 season but folded at the end of November.

Gander didn't enter a team in the NSHL for the 1974-75 and 1975-76 seasons. In 1975, Flyers alumni formed the Intermediate 'B' Gander Lakers and joined the Central Intermediate B Hockey League. The Lakers team became the re-formed Flyers and joined the Newfoundland Senior League for the 1976-77 season. After the team folded in November 1983, Flyers alumni re-formed the Gander Lakers and joined the Central Beothuck Intermediate Hockey League for the 1983-84 season.

The Flyers made their first all-Newfoundland finals appearance in 1961] but lost to the Conception Bay CeeBees in four straight games. Gander won its first NSHL championship and Herder Memorial Trophy in 1969 and added a second title in 1980. The club sat out the 1980-81 season but rejoined in 1981-82, making it to another Herder Finals but lost in seven games. It was the Flyers' fourth finals appearance in five seasons.

For the 2009-10 season, the Flyers returned as one of three teams that formed the Central Newfoundland Intermediate Hockey League (CNIHL). The Gander "Rec" Flyers played for three seasons in the CNIHL until 2012.  After a 16-year absence from Newfoundland Senior hockey, the Gander Flyers joined the re-formed Newfoundland Senior Hockey League (NSHL) in the fall of 2012. The team's home ice was at the Gander Community Centre.

On June 4, 2014, the Flyers were one of four teams that announced their departure from the Newfoundland Senior Hockey League in order to form a new league to be the Central West Senior Hockey League. That year the Flyers didn't score highly in the league standings, although early 2015 results were better. Also in 2014, the Flyers were in the news when their goaltender Patrick O'Brien, a trained paramedic, ran from the locker room wearing all of his equipment to give CPR and helped to save the life of a fan in the stands as the game was about to begin.

In 2015, the Flyers signed former National Hockey League player, Arron Asham.

Seasons and records

Season by season results
This is a list of the last three seasons completed by the Gander Flyers. For the full season-by-season history, see List of Gander Flyers seasons.

Note: GP = Games played, W = Wins, L = Losses, T = Ties, OTL = Overtime Losses, Pts = Points, GF = Goals for, GA = Goals against, DNQ = Did not qualify

NSHL = Newfoundland Senior Hockey League, CWSHL = Central West Senior Hockey League

Allan Cup results

Current roster
For the current team roster see the Flyers profile on the league website

Leaders

Team captains
John Murphy, 1958–59
Bill Ireland, 1960-61
Dick Power, 1966–67
Harry Katrynuk, 1968–69
Jack Faulkner, 1971-72
Bruce Sparkes, 1979–80
Peter Campbell, 2013–14
Ray Dalton, 2014–15
Mike Dyke, 2015–16
Mitchell Oake, 2016-18
Jordan Escott, 2018-Present

Head coaches
Wes Trainor, 1958–61
Jacques Allard (playing-coach)
Wayne Maxner
Jack Faulkner
Dennis Laing, 2012–14
Chris Peach, 2014–15
Ben Fitzgerald, 2015–16
Ryan Power, 2016
Rick Sheppard, 2017-Present

Team awards
Most Valuable Player
Tyler Carroll, 2017
Jordan Escott, 2018
Jordan Escott, 2019

Terry Oake Heart & Soul Award
Mitchell Oake, 2017
Paul Hutchings, 2018
Thomas Hedges, 2019

Dedication Award
Evan Mosher, 2019

League trophies and awards
Leading Scorer
Jordan Escott, 2018
Jordan Escott, 2019

Rookie of the Year
Andrew Ryan, 2016
Brad Power, 2018
Jonathan Coffey, 2019

Most Gentlemanly and Effective Player
Jordan Escott, 2017

Coach of the Year
Rick Sheppard, 2018

League MVP
Jordan Escott, 2018
Jordan Escott, 2019

Hockey NL (HNL) trophies and awards

HNL Team awards
Two all-Newfoundland senior hockey championships (Herder Memorial Trophy): 1969, 1980
First place in the Newfoundland Senior Hockey League (Evening Telegram Trophy):

HNL Individual awards
S. E. Tuma Memorial Trophy (Top scorer in the regular season)
Mike Kelly, 1966 (91 pts)
Mike Kelly, 1967 (92 pts)
Jacques Allard, 1968 (131 pts)
Jacques Allard, 1969 (126 pts))
Jack Faulkner, 1971 (74 pts)
Wayne Maxner, 1972 (111 pts)
Denis Goulding, 1977 (91 pts)
Edward Philpott, 1979 (126 pts)
Zane Forbes, 1980 (94 pts)

President's Top Goaltender Award
Lyle Carter, 1967 (3.89 GAA)
Kevin Kelly 1980 (3.55 GAA)

Albert "Pee Wee" Crane Memorial Award" (Rookie of the year)
Zane Forbes, 1978
Jim Mercer, 1982
Derek Dalley, 1988
Andrew Ryan, 2016

Howie Clouter Memorial Trophy (Most gentlemanly and effective player)
Tom Rafuse, 1977
Ted Mercer, 1978
Ed Philpott, 1979
Tom Rafuse, 1980
Jordan Escott, 2017

Cliff Gorman Memorial Award (Most valuable player of the Herder Playoffs)
Zane Forbes, 1982

Honoured members

Retired numbers
Note: the year of number retirement is noted
 #16 Ed Philpott (2017)

NL Hockey Hall of Fame
The following people associated with the Flyers have been inducted into the Newfoundland and Labrador Hockey Hall of Fame (NLHHOF).
Note: the year of induction into NLHHOF is noted

John Murphy (1995)
Jack Faulkner (1995)
Mike Kelly (1999)
Ed Philpott (2000)
Jacques Allard (2001)
Dick Power (2001)
Claude Brown (2004)
Harry Katrynuk (2007)
Leo Kane (2007)
J.C. Garneau (2014)

References

Bibliography

Ice hockey in Newfoundland and Labrador
Ice hockey teams in Newfoundland and Labrador
Gander, Newfoundland and Labrador
1947 establishments in Newfoundland
Ice hockey clubs established in 1947
Senior ice hockey teams